Diary of a Gigolo is an American television miniseries produced by Underground for Telemundo. It stars Jesús Castro, Victoria White, and Fabiola Campomanes.

Diary of a Gigolo premiered on Netflix on September 7, 2022.

Plot 
Emanuel (Jesús Castro) is an escort who lives a luxurious life. After surviving a childhood of violence and poverty, Emanuel forms a bond with Minou (Adriana Barraza), a businesswoman who takes him under her wing and helps him become a sought-after escort. But his destiny changes when Ana (Fabiola Campomanes), one of his frequent clients, offers him a complex job: to seduce her daughter Julia (Victoria White) in order to strengthen her self-esteem. With Julia's arrival, Emanuel unexpectedly becomes romantically involved, leading him to question his life choices. Consumed by jealousy for the growing love that she herself encouraged, Ana threatens to tell her daughter the truth about Emanuel in order to put an end to their romance. Blinded by his passion for Julia, Emanuel fails to see the dangers that will affect his uncertain future with her and his life as a gigolo.

Cast

Main 
 Jesús Castro as Emanuel
 Victoria White as Julia
 Fabiola Campomanes as Ana
 Francisco Denis as Victor
 Begoña Narváez as Florencia
 Eugenia Tobal as Dolores
 Alosian Vivancos as Abel
 Adriana Barraza as Minou

Recurring 
 Carlos Portaluppi as Román
 Carla Pandolfi as Campos
 Diego Alfonso as Aguilar
 Nacho Gadano as Padilla
 Juan Cottet as Lino
 Gastón Ricaud as Facundo
 Manuela Pal as Leticia
 Graciela Tenenbaum as Rosa
 Mirta Márquez as Lola
 Victoria Biocca as Margui

Production 
The series was announced on May 12, 2021 at Telemundo's upfront for the 2021-2022 television season. The cast was announced on November 15, 2021. Filming took place from September 2021 to December 2021.

Release 
The series was originally scheduled to premiere in January 2022. However, the premiere had been delayed for unexplained reasons. On August 25, 2022, it was announced that the series would premiere on Netflix on September 7, 2022. The series premiered on Telemundo on 12 November 2022.

References

External links 
 
 

2020s American television series
2020 American television series debuts
Telemundo original programming
Spanish-language Netflix original programming